Puffing Billy may refer to:

 Puffing Billy Railway, a narrow-gauge heritage tourist railway near Melbourne, Australia
 Puffing Billy (locomotive), an early steam locomotive
 Puffing Billy Tournament, a board game convention focusing on train games
 Puffin' Billy, a famous piece of light music by Edward White
 Puffing Billy, military jargon for the M67 Immersion Heater
 Puffing Billy, a short lived comic strip in The Beano about a fat boy called Billy
 Puffing Billy, a vacuum cleaner constructed by Hubert Cecil Booth.